HMS Tigris was a T-class submarine of the Royal Navy. She was laid down at Chatham Dockyard and launched in October 1939.

Career
Tigris had a relatively active career, serving in the North Sea and the Mediterranean.

Home waters
Tigris was active in the Bay of Biscay from July 1940, under the command of Commander Howard Bone. She sank the French fishing vessels Sancte Michael, Cimcour, Charles Edmond and Rene Camaleyre, the French merchantmen Jacobsen and Guilvinec, and the German tanker Thorn.

On 5 July 1941 Tigris torpedoed and sank the Italian submarine  150 nm off the Gironde estuary as the Italian submarine was on passage to the Atlantic.

She was assigned to operate in the North Sea near the Scandinavian coast in mid-1941.

Post-war, the Norwegian public was told the attacks had been carried out by Soviet submarines. She also attacked and badly damaged the German auxiliary submarine chaser Uj-1201 off the Rolvsøy Fjord. The bow of the ship sank but the stern was towed to port and the ship was rebuilt, entering service again in April 1944. In addition, Tigris unsuccessfully attacked the German merchant ship Bessheim and a merchantman of 3,000 tons; she also attacked a convoy, but missed her targets; the Norwegian merchant ships Mimona, Tugela and Havbris.

Mediterranean
Tigris was reassigned to the Mediterranean, and was active there from late 1942. On 6 December, she torpedoed and sank the Italian submarine Porfido, for which her commander, George Colvin, was later awarded the Distinguished Service Order. On 21 January 1943, she sank the Italian merchant ship Citta di Genova in the Strait of Otranto. This ship was carrying Greek officers, who were being taken to Italy as hostages; many of them perished.

Sinking
Tigris left Malta on 18 February 1943 to patrol off Naples. On 22 February the Italian merchant ship Teramo was attacked by a British submarine, believed to have been Tigris. She was last sighted at 0730 on 24 February,  from Capri. On the morning of 27 February, the German submarine chaser , commanded by Otto Pollmann, was escorting a convoy six miles southeast of Capri. She made contact with a submarine and carried out three depth charge attacks, the third attack brought oil to the surface and the contact was noted to be stationary. A fourth attack of fifteen depth charges brought a huge bubble of air up. On 6 March, Tigris was ordered to Algiers but there was no reply to this signal. She failed to return to Algiers on 10 March 1943 and was declared overdue on that date. It is believed that Tigris was the submarine sunk on 27 February by UJ-2210.

Tributes
The submarine had been adopted by the town of Newbury during the Second World War as part of Warship Week. The plaque from this adoption is held by the National Museum of the Royal Navy in Portsmouth.

Each year there is an annual Remembrance Service for the submarine and the crew lost at St Nicolas Church, Newbury, Berkshire, on the Sunday nearest 27 February.  In 2016, the Remembrance Service was held on 24 July at 11.45 a.m. to allow descendants of her last commander, George Colvin, to attend.  In 2017, it will be on 26 February.  In 2018, the 75th and final commemoration is scheduled for 8 July
From 2019 onwards a small memorial service will be held at the Royal British Legion Newbury branch on the Sunday nearest 27 February.

References

Publications

External links

 

British T-class submarines of the Royal Navy
Ships built in Chatham
1939 ships
World War II submarines of the United Kingdom
Lost submarines of the United Kingdom
World War II shipwrecks in the Mediterranean Sea
Maritime incidents in February 1943
Ships lost with all hands
Submarines sunk by German warships